Abisara rogersi, the light banded Judy, is a butterfly in the family Riodinidae. The species was first described by Herbert Druce in 1878. It is found in Nigeria, Cameroon, Angola, the Democratic Republic of the Congo, Uganda, Tanzania and Zambia. The habitat consists of shady areas in forests and open areas in submontane forests.

The larvae possibly feed on Maesa species.

Subspecies
Abisara rogersi rogersi (Nigeria, Cameroon, Angola, Democratic Republic of the Congo, Zambia)
Abisara rogersi simulacris Riley, 1932 (Democratic Republic of the Congo: Ituri, Uganda, north-western Tanzania)

References

Butterflies described in 1878
Abisara
Butterflies of Africa
Taxa named by Hamilton Herbert Druce